This is a list of United States ambassadors to the Swiss Confederation and the Principality of Liechtenstein.

History 
Since 1997, the U.S. ambassador to Switzerland has also been accredited to the Principality of Liechtenstein. Appointed on February 10, 1997, Ambassador Madeleine M. Kunin served as the first United States Ambassador to Liechtenstein. She presented her credentials to Liechtenstein on March 14, 1997, which marked the beginning of the United States' diplomatic relations with the country. (Although the United States executed its first treaty with Liechtenstein in 1926, at the time Liechtenstein was represented by Switzerland.)

Before 1997 it was understood that the rights of a U.S.–Swiss agreement also extended to citizens of Liechtenstein because it had yielded control of its foreign affairs to Switzerland. At the end of the 20th century, however, it "began pursuing independent membership in international organizations".

Political appointees 

U.S. ambassadors are nominated by the President and confirmed by the U.S. Senate. The position of ambassador to Switzerland is generally held by a political appointee rather than a career Foreign Service Officer (FSO). According to the American Foreign Service Association, only two career FSOs since 1960 have been appointed to the Swiss and Liechtenstein ambassadorship (both times were in the 1970s), whereas the remaining twenty ambassadors were political appointees, typically those known as "campaign bundlers" who raise large sums of money for presidential campaigns.

List of ambassadors

Recess appointments
The following were commissioned during a Senate recess and thus were recommissioned after their post-recess confirmations.
 George Harrington (confirmed January 22, 1866)
 Nicholas Fish II (confirmed October 30, 1877)
 Boyd Winchester (confirmed January 21, 1866)
 John L. Peak (confirmed December 21, 1866)
 Charles Page Bryan (twice commissioned during recess but did not serve under either)

Other cases
Theodore Sedgwick Fay was nominated to be Envoy Extraordinary and Minister Plenipotentiary on February 25, 1856, but his nomination was withdrawn before the Senate acted on it. George Schneider was commissioned during a Senate recess and he took the oath of office but did not proceed to post.

References

See also
Ambassadors of the United States
Foreign relations of Liechtenstein
Foreign relations of Switzerland
Liechtenstein–United States relations
Switzerland–United States relations
Swiss Ambassador to the United States

References
United States Department of State: Background notes on Switzerland
United States Department of State: Background notes on Liechtenstein

External links
 United States Department of State: Chiefs of Mission for Switzerland
 United States Department of State: Chiefs of Mission for Liechtenstein
 United States Department of State: Switzerland
 United States Department of State: Liechtenstein
 United States Embassy in Bern

Switzerland and Liechtenstein

United States
United States